Arnar Jónsson may refer to:

Arnar Jónsson (actor), Icelandic actor
Arnar Freyr Jónsson, Icelandic basketball player